Patrick J. Howard (January 5, 1847 – April 8, 1914) was an Irish American politician in Chicago. Born in Kingstown, Ireland, he immigrated to New York City with his family before moving to Chicago in 1854. A Democrat, Howard served two terms as City Clerk of Chicago from 1879 to 1883. Following his tenure as City Clerk, he was appointed assistant to the City Treasurer of Chicago. He died in 1914 at the age of 67.

References

1847 births
1914 deaths
Irish emigrants to the United States
Illinois Democrats
Politicians from Chicago
19th-century American politicians